For the Italian football (soccer) club, see Fiorentina

Grupo Desportivo, Recreativo e Cultural Fiorentina is a football club that plays in the city of Porto Novo in island of Santo Antão in Cape Verde.  The team plays in the Santo Antão Island League (South) since 2007.

History
The club was founded in 1994, It is not the only club with the name Fiorentina in Cape Verde, another is Fiorentina-Calabaceira, a member of the Santiago South Regional Football Association.

The club won their first trophy in 1997.  Fiorentina celebrated its 10th anniversary of its foundation in 2004. Fiorentina became an official registered club in 2005 and formally became a member of the Santo Antão South Regional Football Association (ARFSSA) in 2007.  Alongside Lajedos (then as Lagedos) and Inter, they played their first match in 2008. The team won its first title in 2008 winning their league of their island getting a place in the national championship, they never won a single game and only had two ties and a total of two points.

Fiorentina did not appear in the competition in 2011 and in 2012 and from 2014 to 2015 due to financial problems and a small part low popularity.  The club returned during the 2015/16 season, their first match of the season was against Lajedos and was also their last, unlike some other leagues and championships, the half-season meetings were out of order, the club finished fifth with four wins, two draws, five losses and 14 points.  Fiorentina finished fourth in 2017 but with 12 points, two less than last season as they had 3 wins and draws and 6 losses.

Honours
 Santo Antão Island League (South): 1
 2007/08

League and cup history

National championship

Island/Regional Championship

Statistics
Best position: 5th – Group Stage (national)
Appearances at championship competitions:
National: Once, in 2008
Regional: 6
Appearance at a super cup competition: Once, in 2008
Appearances at cup competitions:
Santo Antão South: 6
Santo Antão: 2
Appearance at opening tournaments: 4
Total goals scored: 2 (national)
Total points: 2 (national)
Worst defeat at the Regional championships: Fiorentina 0–10 Académica do Porto Novo , February 27, 2016

Notes

External links
Official website as a blog page at Blogspot 
Fiorentina do Porto Novo at Facebook
Club profile at the Final Ball 

Football clubs in Santo Antão, Cape Verde
Santo Antão Island League (Porto Novo)
1994 establishments in Cape Verde
Association football clubs established in 1994